The Rugby Championship of Yugoslavia was the highest level competition of the Rugby union in Yugoslavia. The league lasted until 1991, when several successor leagues were formed.

Results

Wins by club 

 RK Nada Split (11 championships)
 RK Čelik Zenica (7 championships)
 RK Zagreb (6 championships)
 RK Partizan Belgrade (5 championships)
 RK Dinamo Pančevo (4 championships)
 Mladost Zagreb (1 championship)
 RK Jedinstvo Pančevo (1 championship)

Rugby union in Yugoslavia
Yugoslavian
Rugby union
Sports leagues established in 1957
1957 establishments in Yugoslavia
Rugby